Caldwell Hall occupies a central position on the campus of the University of Arkansas at Pine Bluff in Pine Bluff, Arkansas.  It is a large, T-shaped two-story brick building with Late Gothic Revival features, which was built in 1928 to a design by the noted Arkansas architectural firm Thompson, Sanders, & Ginocchio.  Its central entrance section has Art Deco features in stone panels above the entrance, and fluted stone piers that rise to streamlined finials.

The building was listed on the National Register of Historic Places in 1982.

References

Buildings and structures completed in 1928
Buildings and structures in Pine Bluff, Arkansas
Gothic Revival architecture in Arkansas
Late Gothic Revival architecture
National Register of Historic Places in Pine Bluff, Arkansas
University and college buildings on the National Register of Historic Places in Arkansas